Witlingo is a B2B Software as a Service (SaaS) company that enables businesses and organization of all sizes to use the latest innovations in Human Language Technology and Conversational AI, such Speech recognition, Natural Language Processing, IVR (traditional as well as for smart speakers such as the Amazon Echo, Google Assistant), Virtual Assistant apps on Smartphone platforms(iOS and Android), Chatbots, and Digital audio, to deeply engage with their communities (e.g., their prospects, customers, and supporters).

History
Witlingo, Inc., was launched in February 2016 by Ahmed Bouzid, former Product Head at Amazon Alexa and former VP of Product of Angel.com.   Witlingo became an official preferred partner of Google Assistant on December 8, 2016  and of Amazon Alexa on February 2, 2017.

In May 2017, with the launch of The Motley Fool on Microsoft Cortana, Witlingo was one of the first voice recognition providers to launch a brand company on all three platforms: Amazon Alexa, Google Assistant, and Microsoft Cortana. On July 11, 2017, Witlingo launched an service that enables companies and organizations to voice enable their Facebook pages. On August 8, 2017, the company launched its Voice First Portal offering for all three platforms.   In the December 2018, Wilingo launched Castlingo, its Microcasting service, then in 2019 its Witlingo Communities product.  

Currently, Witlingo is enabling businesses and organizations launch ChatGPT based chatbots and voicebots.

Products
 Witlingo Communities
 Witlingo Chabots
 Witlingo Voicebots
 Witlingo Microcasts
 Witlingo Digital Audio Stations
 Witlingo Audio NFTs

Customers
Witlingo customers include recognizable names such as The Motley Fool, The AARP Foundation,  HP, Dreamworks, Parker Life, Volunteers of America, TD Ameritrade, Meetup, Cooley LLP, Fish & Richardson.  The company's partners include Amazon, Google, Microsoft, and Samsung.

See also
 ChatGPT
 Texting
 Amazon Echo
 Amazon Alexa
 Google Assistant
 Microsoft Cortana
 Speech recognition
 Natural Language Processing
 Voice User Interface

References

External links
 
 

 
 
 
 
 
 
 
 
 
 
 

Software companies based in Virginia
Companies based in McLean, Virginia
American companies established in 2016
Privately held companies based in Virginia
Software companies of the United States